The Entertainment Herald was a bilingual trade publication serving film producers in the United States, and UK, reaching distributors in Spain and Latin America. The first issue appeared in September 1985, the last in October 1986.

History
The Entertainment Herald was founded in 1985 during a worldwide period of expansion of the Home Video markets. The magazine supported itself with advertising revenues.  Its editorial offices were located at 6331 Hollywood Blv., Suite 1102, Los Angeles, California. The unique design that characterized The Entertainment Herald is credited to graphic Designer Oscar "Negro" Díaz

Editorial content
The Entertainment Herald featured an array of articles, chronicles, charts, reviews, festival summaries, special reports, as well as interviews to celebrities, producers, directors and distributors such as Jon Voight, Christian Halsey-Solomon, Menahem Golan, Andrew Vajna, Paul Mazursky, Michael Dudikoff, David Brown, Manuel Antin, Krzystof Zanussi, and María Conchita Alonso.

Staff
Eduardo Montes-Bradley and Nelson Montes-Bradley (Publishers), Claudia Camps (Associate Producer), Oscar “Negro” Diaz (Art Director), Sergio Navarro (Production Coordinator). Ariel Gomes, 46-48 Rue Victor Hugo, 93500, Pantin, France (Paris Bureau), Contributors: Eduardo Montes-Bradley, Ariel Gomes, Raúl Pérez Arias, Alejandro Chionetti, Marta Santelli, Ricardo Ragendorfer.

Distribution
''The Entertainment Herald’’ was mailed by subscription to television and cable station programmers and heads of acquisitions, Home Video distributors, and a growing number of video stores in Latin America. TEH was also distributed at MIFED, Cannes Film Festival, MIP TV, American Film Market, Rio Film Festival and had occasional presence at selected Consumer Electronic Shows in New York and Las Vegas.

Advertising content
The Cannon Group. Los Angeles, California
Condor Group, A Division of Heron Communications, Inc.  Fresno, California
American Film Marketing Association. Los Angeles, California
Video Chile S.A. Chile
Empresa Cinematográfica Lubisar S.A. Perú
Skouras Pictures. Los Angeles, California
Pelican Video. Canoga Park, California
Shapiro Entertainment Worldwide Distribution. Studio City, California
New World Pictures. Los Angeles, California.
Tauro Video. Argentina
Azteca Films, Inc. Hollywood, California
Madera Cinevideo, Inc. Madera, California
Arista Films. Encino, California.
Trans World Entertainment. Middlesex, England
Magnum Video Tape. Burbank CA
Profono Internacional Inc., Argentina
Video Mago, Los Angeles, California
Dennis Davidson Associates, Ltd. London, England
Melody Records, Argentina
Discos CBS International, Mexico
Inter Pictures Home Entertainment, Corp. New York
Goldfarb Distributors, Inc. Los Angeles, California
World Video Marketing, Inc. Beverly Hills, California
Videoco S.A. Buenos Aires
South West Record Distributor. San Antonio Texas
Acuario Distribution, Co. NJ
San Sebastian International Film Festival. San Sebastian, Spain
Australian Film Office. Los Angeles, California
Star Media Sales, Inc. Los Angeles, California
Latin Home Entertainment, Los Angeles, California
West Coast Video, Los Angeles, California
Esmeralda Video Editora EVE. Argentina
Exhivideo, S.A. Argentina
Carolco Pictures. Berverly Hills, California
Clahuen S.A. Argentina
Cinea Producciones S.A. Argentina
Noran S.R.L. Argentina
Hardcore Films & Video. Argentina
WEA Discos S.R.L. Argentina
A&M Discos Latino, USA
Producciones Dawi S.A. Argentina
Paris Video Home S.A. Argentina
Ohanian Producciones. Argentina
Argentina Video Film. Argentina
Producers International. Van Nuys, California
Midem. Paris, France.
Euramco International, Inc. Beverly Hills, California
Caribe Comunicaciones S.A. Argentina
Interteve S.R.L. Argentina
Video Laser Producciones S.R.L. Argentina
Atlas Home Video Entertainment, Inc. Los Angeles, California
Producciones Video Home S.R.L. Argentina
GHB Films S.R.L. Argentina

Notes

1985 establishments in California
1986 disestablishments in California
Bilingual magazines
Defunct magazines published in the United States
Entertainment magazines published in the United States
Film magazines published in the United States
Magazines about the media
Magazines established in 1985
Magazines disestablished in 1986
Magazines published in California
Professional and trade magazines
Spanish-language magazines
Spanish-language mass media in California
VNU Business Media publications